Williamson Valley may refer to:

A valley
 Williamson Valley (Arizona) in Yavapai County, Arizona
 Williamson Valley (California) in San Benito County, California

A populated place
 Williamson Valley, Arizona an earlier name of Simmons, Arizona